Kula is a town in northwestern Bulgaria. It is the administrative centre of Kula Municipality part of Vidin Province. Located just east of the Serbian-Bulgarian border, it is the third largest town in the province after Vidin and Belogradchik. Kula lies 30 kilometres west of Vidin and 13 kilometres east of the border checkpoint at Vrashka Chuka. As of 2021, the town has a population of 2400 inhabitants.

History 
Kula is the modern site of the Late Roman fortress of Castra Martis, the ruins of which can still be seen today, which also was a bishopric in the Roman province of Dacia Ripensis and remains a Latin Catholic titular see under the Latin name.
 
The town has a museum exhibiting various tools and everyday items found in the fortress, as well as a miniature model of the Roman town. While within Danube Vilayer of the Ottoman Empire, the town was called Adliye and Yezdanşêr became its Governor in the late 1860s. 
 
The most important local industry is the rubber and plastic processing factory.

Eponymy 
Castra Martis Hill on Livingston Island in the South Shetland Islands, Antarctica is named after the fortress of Castra Martis.

References

Sources and external links 
 Website about Kula

Towns in Bulgaria
Populated places in Vidin Province
Kula Municipality, Bulgaria